Elisa Queirolo (born 6 March 1991) is an Italian water polo player. 

She was part of the Italian team winning the bronze medal at the 2015 World Aquatics Championships, where she played in the centre back position.
She was part of the Italian team at the 2016 Summer Olympics.

See also
 List of Olympic medalists in water polo (women)
 List of World Aquatics Championships medalists in water polo

References

External links
 
 

1991 births
Living people
Place of birth missing (living people)
Italian female water polo players
Water polo drivers
Water polo players at the 2016 Summer Olympics
Medalists at the 2016 Summer Olympics
Olympic silver medalists for Italy in water polo
World Aquatics Championships medalists in water polo
People from Santa Margherita Ligure
Sportspeople from the Province of Genoa
21st-century Italian women